Ngandwe Miyambo (born 29 September 1983) is a Zambian badminton player. She was the runner-up at the 2015 Botswana International tournament in the women's doubles event teamed-up with Elizaberth Chipeleme. They were defeated by Ogar Siamupangila and Grace Gabriel in the straight sets. The pair also the runner-up at the 2016 Zambia International tournament. Miyambo was a part of the Zambia team to win bronze at the 2017 African Badminton Championships.

Achievements

BWF International Challenge/Series (2 runners-up)
Women's Doubles

 BWF International Challenge tournament
 BWF International Series tournament
 BWF Future Series tournament

References

External links
 

1983 births
Living people
Zambian female badminton players